The Arkansas Diamonds were a soccer club based in Little Rock, Arkansas that competed in the SISL and USISL. The team was first owned by Samir Haj, a youth club coach based in Fayetteville, Arkansas. The franchise struggled for funding as it first played outdoor at Scott Field in Little Rock and its indoor games on the road. The team also played ambassador for Arkansas by hosting Russian professional soccer team Nitsru Kishnev in 1989 and 1990 in a combination of indoor and outdoor international "friendlies".  Several local players that grew up in the Arkansas soccer leagues played in the earlier years including David T. Jones, Brad Shock and Robb Fischer from the Westside Futbol Club.  In 1992 the team took a hiatus as it looked for new ownership. Rusellville, Arkansas businessman John Sandford came to the rescue in 1992/93 partnering with Soccer USA an indoor soccer center that was based in North Little Rock, Arkansas. The franchise reverted to the USISL and in 1994 competed as the Arkansas A's playing its games in Sherwood, Arkansas. The team was owned by the former Arkansas State Soccer Association's DOC Nigel Boulton and a small group of dedicated parents whose children played for the A's youth teams run by Boulton. Funding remained a serious problem and in 1995 the group sold the franchise rights to a Tennessee businessman but the team was never reborn in Arkansas or relocated elsewhere.

Year-by-year

References

Defunct soccer clubs in Arkansas
USISL teams
Association football clubs established in 1989
Association football clubs disestablished in 1995
1989 establishments in Arkansas
1995 disestablishments in Arkansas
Sherwood, Arkansas